Hypotia miegi is a species of snout moth in the genus Hypotia. It was described by Ragonot in 1895, and is known from Spain.

References

Moths described in 1895
Hypotiini